The 1962 Cotton Bowl Classic was the 26th edition of the college football bowl game, played at the Cotton Bowl in Dallas, Texas, on Monday, January 1. Part of the 1961–62 bowl game season, the game featured the third-ranked Texas Longhorns of the Southwest Conference (SWC) and the #5 Ole Miss Rebels of the Southeastern Conference (SEC). Ole Miss was slightly favored, but Texas won, 12–7.

Teams

Both teams had been ranked first in the polls before-mid season losses knocked them out of championship contention. At the end of the regular season, both were still ranked in the top five, which made for an interesting bowl matchup.

The Longhorns were co-champions of the Southwestern Conference while Ole Miss finished third in the Southeastern Conference. Texas was fourth in offense while Ole Miss was first. Both teams were in the middle of bowl streaks, the Longhorns were in their third consecutive bowl game, while Ole Miss was in their fifth consecutive bowl game.

Texas

The Longhorns were making their first of three consecutive Cotton Bowl appearances.

Mississippi

Game summary
Tommy Ford intercepted Glynn Griffing's pass, which gave the Longhorns the ball at the Rebels' 34. Seven plays later, James Saxton scored from a yard out to give Texas the lead 47 seconds into the game. But Eldon Moritz's extra point attempt was blocked by James Dunaway to make it only 6–0. Mike Cotten drove his team 72 yards which culminated in a 24-yard touchdown pass to Jack Collins. But when Texas tried to make the two-point conversion, it fell short as the Longhorns held a 12–0 halftime lead.

Four minutes into the third quarter, Griffing drove his team 86 yards and threw a twenty-yard touchdown pass to Reed Davis to narrow the lead to five. But the Longhorn defense took over from there. Ole Miss had only one serious chance the rest of the game, as they drove to the 23 with eight minutes to go in the third. But Moses sacked Griffing on fourth down, as both teams did not score the rest of the game as Ole Miss lost their first game against the Southwest Conference.

Scoring
First quarter
 Texas – James Saxton 1-yard run (kick blocked)
Second quarter
 Texas – Jack Collins 24-yard pass from Mike Cotten (run failed)
Third quarter
 Ole Miss – Reed Davis 20-yard pass from Glynn Griffing (Sullivan kick)
Fourth quarter
No scoring

Statistics
{| class=wikitable style="text-align:center"
! Statistics !! Texas !! Miss
|-
| First Downs || 12|| 17
|-
| Yards Rushing|| 123|| 127
|-
| Yards Passing || 60|| 192
|-
| Total Yards || 183|| 319
|-
|Punts–Average ||5–40.2|| 4–32.5
|-
|Fumbles–Lost ||2–1|| 1–1
|-
|Interceptions|| 3|| 5
|-
|Penalties–Yards ||3–35|| 4–30
|}

Aftermath
Texas went to the next two Cotton Bowls and later six straight (1969–1974), which included several national championships. The Longhorns also won the 1965 Orange Bowl over top-ranked Alabama.

Ole Miss went undefeated the following year and won the Sugar Bowl, but USC was declared champion by both major polls (AP, UPI). However, since other polls voted them champion, Ole Miss claims the 1962 title; their next Cotton Bowl was in January 2004.

References

Cotton Bowl
Cotton Bowl Classic
Ole Miss Rebels football bowl games
Texas Longhorns football bowl games
January 1962 sports events in the United States
Cotton Bowl